The Buchalter Cosmology Prize, established in 2014, is a prestigious annual prize bestowed by Dr. Ari Buchalter.

Every year, three Buchalter Prizes are awarded in recognition of ground-breaking work in cosmology with the potential to produce a breakthrough advance in our understanding of how the Universe works, particularly by substantially extending or challenging currently-accepted models. The first, second, and third prize come with a prize money of $10,000, $5,000, and $2,500 respectively. The winners are typically announced in the January meeting of the American Astronomical Society (AAS), placing it de facto among the annual AAS prizes.

Advisors and Judges
Submissions and nominations are overseen by a panel composed of the chairman Dr. Ari Buchalter, an advisory board composed of two senior physicists, and a Judging Panel composed of three senior physicists. The composition of advisory board and Judging Panel is changed periodically. Current members of the advisory board are David Helfand and Marc Kamionkowski, whereas current members of the Judging Panel are Claudia de Rham, Matthew Johnson, and Justin Khoury.

Vision and Mission
The prize was conceived by Dr. Ari Buchalter, a former astrophysicist turned entrepreneur who earned his PhD from Columbia University in 1999 working with David Helfand, on the premise that there are fundamental gaps in our understanding of cosmology, and that several currently-accepted paradigms might be incomplete or incorrect. The prize was created to support the development of new boundary-pushing ideas or discoveries that have the potential to produce a breakthrough advance beyond our present understanding of the Universe.

Recipients
2014
1st prize: Marina Cortês and Lee Smolin, for their work The Universe as a Process of Unique Events.
2nd prize: Jonathan Kaufman, Brian Keating, and Brad Johnson, for their work Precision Tests of Parity Violation Over Cosmological Distances.
3rd prize: Carroll Wainwright, Matthew Johnson, Hiranya Peiris, Anthony Aguirre, Luis Lehner, and Steven Liebling, for their work Simulating the Universe(s): from Cosmic Bubble Collisions to Cosmological Observables with Numerical Relativity.
2015
1st prize: Julian Barbour, Tim Koslowski, and Flavio Mercati, for their work Identification of a gravitational arrow of time.
2nd prize: Nemanja Kaloper and Antonio Padilla, for their work Sequestering the Standard Model Vacuum Energy.
3rd prize: Niayesh Afshordi and Elliot Nelson, for their work Cosmological Non-Constant Problem: Cosmological bounds on TeV-scale physics and beyond.
2016
1st prize: Nima Khosravi, for their work Ensemble Average Theory of Gravity.
2nd prize: Elliot Nelson, for their work Quantum Decoherence During Inflation from Gravitational Nonlinearities.
3rd prize: Cliff Burgess, Richard Holman, Gianmassimo Tasinato, and Matthew Williams, for their work EFT Beyond the Horizon: Stochastic Inflation and How Primordial Quantum Fluctuations Go Classical.
2017
1st prize: Lasha Berezhiani and Justin Khoury, for their work Theory of Dark Matter Superfluidity.
2nd prize: Steffen Gielen and Neil Turok, for their work Perfect Quantum Cosmological Bounce.
3rd prize: Peter Adshead, Diego Blas, Cliff Burgess, Peter Hayman, and Subodh Patil, for their work Magnon Inflation: Slow Roll with Steep Potentials.
2018
1st prize: José Ramón Espinosa, Davide Racco, and Antonio Riotto, for their work A Cosmological Signature of the Standard Model Higgs Vacuum Instability: Primordial Black Holes as Dark Matter.
2nd prize: Douglas Edmonds, Duncan Farrah, Djordje Minic, Jack Ng, and Tatsu Takeuchi, for their work Modified Dark Matter: Relating Dark Energy, Dark Matter and Baryonic Matter.
3rd prize: Jonathan Braden, Matthew Johnson, Hiranya Peiris, Andrew Pontzen, and Silke Weinfurtner, for their work A New Semiclassical Picture of Vacuum Decay.
2019
1st prize: Jahed Abedi and Niayesh Afshordi, for their work Echoes from the Abyss: A highly spinning black hole remnant for the binary neutron star merger GW170817.
2nd prize: Eugenio Bianchi, Anuradha Gupta, Hal Haggard, and Bangalore Sathyaprakash, for their work Quantum gravity and black hole spin in gravitational wave observations: a test of the Bekenstein-Hawking entropy
3rd prize: Jose Beltrán Jiménez, Lavinia Heisenberg, and Tomi Koivisto, for their work The Geometrical Trinity of Gravity.
2020
1st prize: Daniel Green and Rafael Porto, for their work Signals of a Quantum Universe.
2nd prize: Mikhail Ivanov, Marko Simonović, and Matias Zaldarriaga, for their work Cosmological parameters from the BOSS Galaxy Power Spectrum.
3rd prize: Philip Mocz, Anastasia Fialkov, Mark Vogelsberger, Fernando Becerra, Mustafa Amin, Sownak Bose, Michael Boylan-Kolchin, Pierre-Henri Chavanis, Lars Hernquist, Lachlan Lancaster, Federico Marinacci, Victor Robles, and Jesús Zavala, for their work First star-forming structures in fuzzy cosmic filaments.
2021
1st prize: Karsten Jedamzik and Levon Pogosian, for their work Relieving the Hubble tension with primordial magnetic fields.
2nd prize: Azadeh Maleknejad, for their work SU(2) and its Axion in Cosmology: A common Origin for Inflation, Cold Sterile Neutrinos, and Baryogenesis.
3rd prize: Sunny Vagnozzi, Luca Visinelli, Philippe Brax, Anne-Christine Davis, and Jeremy Sakstein, for their work Direct detection of dark energy: the XENON1T excess and future prospects.

Perimeter Institute

Since its inception, the prize has been highly dominated by Perimeter Institute, whose researchers and associates featured for six consecutive years among the prize winners between 2014 and 2019: given the nature of the prize, this is a reflection of the cutting-edge research conducted at the institute.

References

External links
 

Astronomy prizes
Physics awards
Physical cosmology
Awards established in 2014
American awards